Kyle Walters (born July 23, 1973 in St. Thomas, Ontario) is a former professional Canadian football defensive back and is currently the general manager for the Winnipeg Blue Bombers of the Canadian Football League. Walters built the Winnipeg team that won the 107th Grey Cup 33-12 over Hamilton. He played for seven seasons for the Hamilton Tiger-Cats and won a Grey Cup championship as a player with the team in 1999. Following his retirement, he became the defensive coordinator for the University of Guelph Gryphons and served as their head coach from 2006 to 2009. He also played CIAU football for the Gyphons in the early 1990s.

Winnipeg Blue Bombers
The Winnipeg Blue Bombers named Walters interim General Manager for the remainder of the 2013 CFL season following a disappointing 1-5 start. The team didn't finish any better, going 2-10 the rest of the way and failing to qualify for the CFL playoffs. Despite the disappointing finish to the year, the Bombers removed the interim tag and named Walters GM for the 2014 CFL season. In 2014 the Bombers finished 7-11 following a 5-1 start. In the offseason Walters made some key signings for the offensive line, including Stanley Bryant and Jermarcus Hardrick.

Walters helped to build to foundation of a successful Blue Bombers team that saw them have four consecutive double-digit win seasons in 2019. The team carried this success into the 107th Grey Cup which they won over the Hamilton Tiger-Cats 33-12. Due to the championship caliber team he had built, the Bombers extended his contract in 2019 through to the 2023 season. Walters prefers to do the scouting for the team and work in the background, while Mike O'Shea does most of the media interviews for the team. O'Shea was also extended at the same time, though his contract ends one year earlier in 2022.

CFL GM record

References

External links
Winnipeg Blue Bombers bio

1973 births
Living people
People from St. Thomas, Ontario
Hamilton Tiger-Cats players
Canadian football defensive backs
Guelph Gryphons football players
Players of Canadian football from Ontario
Winnipeg Blue Bombers general managers
Guelph Gryphons football coaches